Zikhona Sodlaka (born 7 June 1985 in Mthatha) is a South African actress best known for her starring roles in television series such as Shooting Stars,  Rhythm City, Soul City, Intsika and Montana.
Sodlaka once got a nominated for the South African Film and Television Awards (SAFTA).

She is prominent actress of South Africa in Tsha Tsha, Igazi, Generations. and the film, The Two of Us and Mandela: Long Walk to Freedom.

Early life
Sodlaka was born in Mthatha in the Eastern Cape, she grew up in KwaZulu-Natal. She attended school at Excelsior SSS and left in grade 9. She received the rest of her schooling at Warriors Rust high school in Margate.

She went to Shepstone College where she did her tertiary education and studied Business Admin. She got her diploma and proceeded to Johannesburg and registered as an IT Student and did Computer Programming at Havtec before moving on to pursue her passion for art.

Filmography

television
 After 9 2007-2013
 Rhythm City (2007)
 Skeem Saam (2011)
• Igazi ( 2016 ) 

• The Wife 2021-2022 as Mandisa
   
• Gqeberha : The Empire ( 2023 ) as Bulelwa Mxenge

film
 Mandela: Long Walk to Freedom (2013)
 Thina sobabili:The two of us (2014)
Inhliziyo Yethu (2017)
Mister Bob (2011)

References

External links

1985 births
Living people
South African film actresses
South African television actresses
21st-century South African actresses